Leonard Lewisohn (October 10, 1847 – March 5, 1902) was an American merchant and philanthropist.

Biography
He was born in Hamburg, Germany, to Jewish parents, Julie and Samuel Lewisohn. In 1863, Samuel, a prominent Hamburg merchant, sent Leonard and his brother, Julius Lewisohn, to the United States, as his firm's representatives; about three years later they were joined by their younger brother, Adolph Lewisohn, and they formed the firm of Lewisohn Brothers in January 1866. As early as 1868, the firm turned its attention to the metal trade, becoming prominent dealers in lead during that year. He married Rosalie Jacobs on June 29, 1870, in Manhattan. They had the following children: Jesse Lewisohn (1871–1918), Julia Lewisohn (1872–1927), Samuel Lewisohn (1875–1898), Lillie Lewisohn (1876–1976), Florence (Florine) Lewisohn (1878–1903), Walter Pickett Lewisohn  (1880–1938), Frederick Lewisohn (1881-1959), Alice Lewisohn (1883–1972), Aaron Oscar Lewisohn (1884–1917), and Irene Lewisohn (1886–1944).

He was president of the United Metals Selling Company. Lewisohn was prominent in philanthropy. He contributed to the Alliance colony in New Jersey, founded in 1882, and to almost every philanthropic institution in New York, regardless of creed. He likewise acted as treasurer of the Hebrew Sheltering Guardian Society in New York City, to which institution he gave his counsel and large sums of money. He was one of the largest contributors to the Jewish Theological Seminary of America and to the Montefiore Sanatorium for consumptives.

He died on March 5, 1902, and left an estate worth $12 million (equivalent to $ million in ).

References

Further reading

External links

1847 births
1902 deaths
American mining businesspeople
Jewish American philanthropists
19th-century German Jews
Businesspeople from Hamburg
Lewisohn family
Burials at Salem Fields Cemetery
19th-century American philanthropists
German emigrants to the United States
19th-century American businesspeople